

Rafael Pinhasi (born 1940) is a former Israeli politician who served as Minister of Communications between 1990 and 1992.

Early life
Born in Kabul in Afghanistan, Pinhasi's family made aliyah in 1950. He was amongst the founders of Shas, and served as deputy mayor of Bnei Brak.

Knesset career
In 1984, he was elected to the Knesset on Shas's list, and in December 1985, he was appointed Deputy Minister of Labor and Social Welfare. He retained his seat in the 1988 elections, and became a Deputy Speaker of the Knesset. In January 1990, he was appointed Deputy Internal Affairs Minister, and in June that year, he became Minister of Communications, serving until the 1992 elections.

As communications minister, he was criticized for granting operating licenses to communications entities owned by his associates. However, he was also credited with opening the telephone market, previously dominated by Bezeq, to competition. Pinhasi granted new licenses for last-mile infrastructure, international calling, satellite communications, etc.

He retained his seat in the election, and was appointed Deputy Minister of Finance in August, holding the post until he became Deputy Minister of Religious Affairs. He was forced to resign from the cabinet by the High Court of Justice in September 1993 after being convicted for making false declarations, a crime deemed to be of "moral turpitude".

Re-elected in 1996, Pinhasi lost his seat in the 1999 elections. In 2008, he was appointed chairman of the Tel Aviv cemeteries council.

See also 
 List of Israeli public officials convicted of crimes or misdemeanors

References

External links
 

1940 births
Living people
Afghan emigrants to Israel
Afghan Jews
Israeli Orthodox Jews
Deputy mayors of places in Israel
Deputy ministers of Israel
Deputy Speakers of the Knesset
Israeli government officials convicted of crimes
Israeli people of Afghan-Jewish descent
Israeli politicians convicted of fraud
Members of the 11th Knesset (1984–1988)
Members of the 12th Knesset (1988–1992)
Members of the 13th Knesset (1992–1996)
Members of the 14th Knesset (1996–1999)
People from Bnei Brak
People from Kabul
Rabbis convicted of crimes
Shas politicians
Israeli politicians convicted of crimes
Ministers of Communications of Israel